Frank Pangallo (born October 1954) is an Australian journalist and politician. He has been an SA Best member of the South Australian Legislative Council since the 2018 state election.

Pangallo worked for the News in Adelaide, becoming editor in 1989, and from 1995 was a television reporter on Today Tonight. In 2017 he became a media advisor to Nick Xenophon. He was second on the SA Best ticket at the 2018 state election.

References

1954 births
Living people
Members of the South Australian Legislative Council
Nick Xenophon's SA-BEST members of the Parliament of South Australia
21st-century Australian politicians